Hervé Nguemba Lomboto (born 27 October 1989) is a Congolese professional footballer who plays as goalkeeper for Motema Pembe and the DR Congo national team.

Professional career
Lomboto began his career with Amazone Kimbanseke in the DR Congo, and in 2012 moved to Vita Club. He had a brief stint with AC Léopards in the Republic of the Congo in 2013, before returning to Vita Club. He followed that up with spells at CS Don Bosco and Dauphins Noirs, before signing with Motema Pembe on 2 February 2021.

International career
Lomboto made his debut with the DR Congo national team in a 2–1 2014 African Nations Championship qualification win over Congo on 7 July 2013.

References

External links
 
 
 FDB Profile

1989 births
Living people
Democratic Republic of the Congo footballers
Democratic Republic of the Congo international footballers
Association football goalkeepers
Footballers from Kinshasa
AS Vita Club players
AC Léopards players
CS Don Bosco players
Linafoot players
Democratic Republic of the Congo expatriate footballers
Democratic Republic of the Congo expatriate sportspeople in the Republic of the Congo
Expatriate footballers in the Republic of the Congo
2022 African Nations Championship players
Democratic Republic of the Congo A' international footballers